Sir William Henry Fancourt Mitchell (November 1811 – 24 November 1884) was an Australian police commissioner and politician, President of the Victorian Legislative Council for fourteen years.

Life
Mitchell was the son of the Rev. George Barkley Mitchell of Leicester, England, vicar of St. Mary's and All Saints', Leicester, and chaplain to the late Duke of York.

Mitchell came to Tasmania in January 1833 on the Sir Thomas Munro and entered the government service. In 1839 he became assistant colonial secretary. 
On 21 August 1841, he married Christina, daughter of Andrew Templeton of Glasgow. 
On 21 March 1842, he resigned his appointment and in April they sailed for Port Phillip where he acquired Barfold station near Kyneton  and a property in Mount Macedon  districts becoming a large proprietor.

Mitchell entered the provisional Victorian Legislative Council in 1852. 
He was appointed by lieutenant-governor Charles La Trobe the first Chief Commissioner of the newly formed Victoria Police, commencing on 8 January 1853, amalgamating all the previous colonial police forces. 
During his leadership, the force increased from 700 to 2000 men, despite defections of large numbers who joined the gold rush.  
He succeeded in successfully reorganizing the force and practically stamping out bushranging. 
During his leadership the situation on the gold fields of Ballarat deteriorated culminating in the Battle of Eureka Stockade on 4 December 1854. 
Mitchell resigned the position in 1854 and was succeeded as Chief Commissioner by Captain Charles MacMahon. 
The Mitchells then paid a visit to England during 1854–55. 
A subsequent Commission of Inquiry criticized the handling of the disturbances and resulted in a drastic reduction of police numbers.

Mitchell returned to Victoria towards the end of 1855, and in 1856 was elected a member of the Victorian Legislative Council, when responsible government was instituted in Victoria, as one of the members for North-Western Province.

Mitchell was defeated at an election held in 1858, but was returned at the next election, and held a Council seat until his death in 1884. In 1882 he transferred from North-West Province to the new Northern Province. He was honorary minister in the first William Haines ministry from 28 November 1855 to 1 March 1857, Postmaster-General in the second Haines ministry from 29 April 1857 to March 1858, and showed himself to be an able administrator. Mitchell was minister for railways in the John O'Shanassy ministry from 30 December 1861 until the government was defeated on 27 June 1863 over land reform. He did not hold office again.

During the conflict between the Legislative Assembly and the Council Mitchell was one of the leaders of the council, and in 1868 was responsible for the act which reduced the qualification of council members and electors. He was elected second President of the Victorian Legislative Council on 27 October 1870,  and carried out his duties with ability, decision and courtesy. In the struggle with the assembly he fought for the privileges of the council, and advocated that the qualifications for both members and electors be further reduced.

Mitchell was made a Knight Bachelor on 17 July 1875 by letters patent while president of the Legislative Council.

Mitchell died after a short illness at Barfold, near Kyneton, on 24 November 1884.
He was survived by 9 children, including the prominent lawyer Sir Edward Fancourt Mitchell.

Notes

References

1811 births
1884 deaths
Victoria (Australia) state politicians
English emigrants to Australia
Australian Knights Bachelor
Australian politicians awarded knighthoods
Presidents of the Victorian Legislative Council
Chief Commissioners of Victoria Police
19th-century Australian politicians
19th-century Australian public servants